Aubrietia is a synonym for any of the approximately 20 species of trailing, purple-flowered plants of the genus Aubrieta, part of the mustard family, Brassicaceae.

Aubrietia may also refer to:

Military
 HMS Aubrietia, name of two ships of the Royal Navy
 , an  launched in 1916 and sold in 1922
 , a Flower-class corvette, launched in 1940 and sold in 1946

Other uses
 Aubrieta deltoidea, a species of flowering plant in the mustard family

See also
 Aubertia (skipper), a family of butterflies